Lieutenant-General Sir Hew Dalrymple Fanshawe,  (30 October 1860 – 24 March 1957) was a British Army general of the First World War, who commanded V Corps on the Western Front and the 18th Indian Division in the Mesopotamian campaign. He was one of three brothers (Edward, Hew, and Robert) who all rose to command divisions or corps during the war.

Fanshawe joined the 19th Hussars in 1882, and after seeing active duty in North Africa became the aide-de-camp to Sir Evelyn Wood VC, a prominent senior officer; he later married Wood's eldest daughter. He served with his regiment during the Boer War, and then commanded a cavalry regiment, followed by brigades in the Home Forces and in India.

Following the outbreak of the First World War, Fanshawe commanded a cavalry division and then the Cavalry Corps in France, before assuming command of V Corps in late 1915. He was removed from command in mid-1916, however, as a result of political manoeuvring following the attempt to find a scapegoat for the failed Actions of St Eloi Craters in March 1916. He later commanded the 18th Indian Division in Mesopotamia and was with it at the end of the war in the Middle East. He retired from the Army in 1920, and served as the ceremonial colonel of the Queen's Bays.

Early career

Fanshawe was born in 1860, the son of the Reverend Henry Leighton Fanshawe, of Chilworth, Oxfordshire. He attended Winchester College and then served in the militia, joining the 19th Hussars in 1882. He was the middle son of three brothers with significant military careers; Edward (b. 1859) joined the artillery and Robert (b. 1863) joined the infantry, all three rising to command corps or divisions during the First World War.

He served in Egypt with his regiment until 1884, when he was promoted to captain, and then in the Sudan with the Nile Expedition until 1885. In 1890, he left regimental duties to be appointed as the aide-de-camp to Major-General Sir Evelyn Wood VC, the commanding officer of Aldershot Command. During his time working for Wood, he met his eldest daughter Pauline; the couple married in 1894, and had two sons and a daughter. One son, Evelyn, later commanded an armoured brigade during the Second World War. He returned to his regiment in 1893, with a promotion to Major, and stayed with them until 1897, when he was appointed to a two-year term as an assistant military secretary in India.

Fanshawe served throughout the second Boer War, where he received a brevet promotion to lieutenant-colonel and was mentioned in despatches twice (including by Lord Kitchener dated 23 June 1902). Following the war, in 1903, he was confirmed in his promotion to lieutenant-colonel and given command of the Queen's Bays. He held command of the regiment until 1907, when he was promoted to take over the 2nd Cavalry Brigade. After three years as a brigadier in the home forces, he was transferred to India in 1910, to command the Presidency Brigade in the Indian Lucknow Division. In 1913, he was promoted to major-general, with command of the Jubbulpore Brigade in the Mhow Division.

First World War

Fanshawe was in India with his brigade on the outbreak of the First World War; whilst it remained in India, he was sent to France and given command of the 1st Indian Cavalry Division, a composite force drawn from the cavalry regiments of the various divisions, in December 1914. The following September he was transferred to command the Cavalry Corps, though by this point of the war, there was little role for cavalry in static trench warfare, and he moved to V Corps, a front-line corps, in October. During his time at the Cavalry Corps, his son Evelyn. served as his aide-de-camp.

At V Corps, Fanshawe oversaw the initial Actions of St Eloi Craters in late March 1916; the attack under his command by 3rd Division was successful, but terrible ground conditions made it hard for them or for the relieving troops in the Canadian Corps, to hold ground, and after a month of heavy losses, the line stabilised at the original positions. Such a situation would normally result in the divisional commanders being sacked; it was 2nd Canadian Division under Richard Turner which had failed to hold the ground but for political reasons, the high command felt it impossible to sack a Canadian commander. Instead, Aylmer Haldane, the commander of 3rd Division, was lined up as a scapegoat; Fanshawe tried to intervene with General Haig and was sacked on 4 July. His replacement at V Corps was, somewhat unusually, his elder brother Edward.

Later in 1916, he took over the 58th (2/1st London) Division on home service and in 1917 was given command of the 18th Indian Division, serving in the Mesopotamian campaign. He commanded it through the end of the war, including at the Battle of Sharqat, the final engagement of the campaign in the Middle East.

Later career

After the Armistice, Fanshawe was given command of an administrative area in France. He retired from the Army in 1920, with a knighthood and the honorary rank of lieutenant-general. In retirement, he served as a justice of the peace in Oxfordshire, living near Thame, and was the ceremonial colonel of the Queen's Bays from 1921 to 1930.

Notes

References

 "FANSHAWE, Lieut.-Gen. Sir Hew Dalrymple", in 
 Obituary in The Times, 26 March 1957, p. 12
 
 

|-
 

|-
 

|-
 

|-
 

|-
 

|-
 

|-

1860 births
1957 deaths
Military personnel from Oxfordshire
British Army lieutenant generals
British Army cavalry generals of World War I
Knights Commander of the Order of the Bath
Knights Commander of the Order of St Michael and St George
People educated at Winchester College
19th Royal Hussars officers
2nd Dragoon Guards (Queen's Bays) officers